France was represented by Jean-Paul Mauric, with the song "Printemps, avril carillonne", at the Eurovision Song Contest 1961, which took place on 18 March in Cannes following Jacqueline Boyer's victory for France the previous year. For 1961, broadcaster RTF opted to hold a national final, which took place on 18 February.

Before Eurovision

National final
The final was hosted by Jacqueline Joubert and Marcelle Cravenne. Six songs took part with the winner being chosen by votes from members of the public who were telephoned by RTF's regional studios.

At Eurovision 
On the night of the final Mauric performed 9th in the running order, following Germany and preceding Switzerland. At the close of the voting "Printemps, avril carillonne" had received 13 points, placing France 4th of the 16 competing entries.

Voting 
Every country had a jury of ten people. Every jury member could give one point to his or her favourite song.

References 

1961
Countries in the Eurovision Song Contest 1961
Eurovision